Ricinocarpeae is a tribe of the subfamily Crotonoideae, under the family Euphorbiaceae. It comprises 2 subtribes and 7 genera.

See also
 Taxonomy of the Euphorbiaceae

References

Crotonoideae
Euphorbiaceae tribes